Multilevel Monte Carlo (MLMC) methods in numerical analysis are algorithms for computing expectations that arise in stochastic simulations. Just as Monte Carlo methods, they rely on repeated random sampling, but these samples are taken on different levels of accuracy. MLMC methods can greatly reduce the computational cost of standard Monte Carlo methods by taking most samples with a low accuracy and corresponding low cost, and only very few samples are taken at high accuracy and corresponding high cost.

Goal 
The goal of a multilevel Monte Carlo method is to approximate the expected value  of the random variable  that is the output of a stochastic simulation. The basis of the multilevel method is the telescoping sum identity,

that is trivially satisfied because of the linearity of the expectation operator. Each of the expectations  is then approximated by a Monte Carlo method, resulting in the multilevel Monte Carlo method.

Hence, most samples will be taken on level , where samples are cheap, and only very few samples will be required at the finest level . In this sense, MLMC can be considered as a recursive control variate strategy.

Applications

The first application of MLMC is attributed to Mike Giles, in the context of stochastic differential equations (SDEs) for option pricing, however, earlier traces are found in the work of Heinrich in the context of parametric integration. Here, the random variable  is known as the payoff function, and the sequence of approximations ,  use an approximation to the sample path  with time step .

The application of MLMC to problems in uncertainty quantification (UQ) is an active area of research. An important prototypical example of these problems are partial differential equations (PDEs) with random coefficients. In this context, the random variable  is known as the quantity of interest, and the sequence of approximations corresponds to a discretization of the PDE with different mesh sizes.

An algorithm for MLMC simulation 
A simple level-adaptive algorithm for MLMC simulation is given below in pseudo-code.
 
 repeat
     Take warm-up samples at level 
     Compute the sample variance on all levels 
     Define the optimal number of samples  on all levels 
     Take additional samples on each level  according to 
     if  then
         Test for convergence
     end
     if not converged then
         
     end
 until converged

Extensions of MLMC
Recent extensions of the multilevel Monte Carlo method include multi-index Monte Carlo, where more than one direction of refinement is considered, and the combination of MLMC with the Quasi-Monte Carlo method.

See also 
 Monte Carlo method
 Monte Carlo methods in finance
 Quasi-Monte Carlo methods in finance
 Uncertainty quantification
 Partial differential equations with random coefficients

References 

Monte Carlo methods
Numerical analysis
Sampling techniques
Stochastic simulation
Randomized algorithms
Articles with example pseudocode